Marie Brassard is a Canadian actress, theatrical writer and director. She is known for her work with playwright and actor Robert Lepage and later for her own French and English theatrical pieces, which  have been presented in many countries in the Americas, Europe and in Australia.

Career
Marie Brassard performed and co-created with Robert Lepage between the years 1985 and 2000 in theatre (The Dragons' Trilogy, Polygraph, The Seven Streams of the River Ota, The Shakespeare Trilogy: Coriolanus, The Tempest and Macbeth), Geometry of Miracles, and in films ( Polygraph, NÔ ). In 2001, she created her first solo play, Jimmy, within the framework of the Festival TransAmériques (although it appears it must have first been presented at Montreal's Edgy Women festival a couple of months prior).

The success of the play led Brassard to found her own production company, Infrarouge, and to begin to work solo. Since then, in collaboration with guest artists from different disciplines and origins, she has created surreal theatre with innovative video, light and sound installations, including The Darkness (2003), Peepshow (2005), The Glass Eye (2007), The Invisible (2008), Me Talking to Myself in the Future (2010), The Fury of my Thoughts (Nelly Arcan), Trieste (2013), Peepshow (version 2016), La vie utile (Évelyne de la Chenelière), Introduction to Violence (2019), Eclipse (2020) and Violence (2021).

Brassard's plays have been performed in numerous countries in the Americas, Australia and Europe, among other places at the Théâtre de l'Odéon in Paris, The Studio at the Sydney Opera in Australia, the Barbican Centre in London UK, the Haus der Berliner Festspiele and the Sophiensaele in Berlin, the Halle G im Museums Quartier and Brut im Künstlerhaus in Vienna, the Kulturhuset in Stockholm, The Malthouse, Merlyn Theatre in Melbourne and the Teatro Espanol in Madrid.

In 2013, she created a collage of texts by Nelly Arcan and staged the piece, titled in French La Fureur de ce que je pense (The Fury of my Thoughts) at Espace Go in Montreal. The piece was later reprised at the FTA in Montreal and Carrefour in Quebec City and performed on tour in Madrid, Limoges and Amsterdam. In 2017, in company of her team, she staged the piece in its Japanese version. Created and originally performed in Tokyo, the play then toured through Japan in Kyoto, Hiroshima, Toyohashi et Kitakyushu. 

Later in her career, Brassard began working as a dance dramaturge and director. She created two dance pieces in collaboration with dancer choreographer Sarah Williams: Moving in this World (2014), developed in residency in Potsdam, was presented in Montreal, Potsdam and in Madrid, and States of Transe (2013). Brassard also choreographed several short pieces in collaboration with a number of choreographers. In different contexts, she worked with Dana Gingras, Anne Thériault, Annik Hamel, Jane Mappin, Anne Plamondon and Karine Denault. She danced in two Isabelle Van Grimde pieces (Perspectives Montreal and The Bodies in Question).

Brassard has appeared in a number of films, including those by Robert Lepage, Michael Winterbottom, Guy Maddin, Ryan McKenna, Denis Côté, Sophie Deraspe Ryan McKenna, Matthew Rankin and Stéphane Lafleur. 

In 2016, she was awarded L'Ordre des arts et des lettres du Québec.

Plays
2021: Violence
2020: Eclipse
2019: Introduction à la violence 
2018: La vie utile (texte d'Évelyne de la Chenelière) 
2017: The Fury of my Thoughts (Japanese version) 
2015: Peepshow (2015) 
2014: The Darkness, revisited 
2013: La Fureur de ce que je pense 
2013: Trieste 
2010: Me talking to Myself in the Future 
2008: The Invisible
2007: The Glass Eye
2005: Peepshow
2003: The Darkness
2001: Jimmy

Film appearances
1997: Polygraph (Le Polygraphe)
1998: Nô
2000: The Claim
2001: The Pig's Law (La Loi du cochon)
2002: Past Perfect
2004: Happiness Is a Sad Song (Le Bonheur c'est une chanson triste)
2006: Congorama
2007: Continental, a Film Without Guns (Continental, un film sans fusil)
2008: Babine
2008: Cadavres
2009: Heat Wave (Les grandes chaleurs)
2009: Vital Signs (Les signes vitaux)
2012: Ésimésac
2013: Vic and Flo Saw a Bear
2014: Roberta
2015: Corbo
2022: Viking

References

External links 
 Infrarouge, Marie Brassard's Production Company
 
 "Marie Brassard".  The Canadian Encyclopedia.

Living people
Canadian stage actresses
Canadian film actresses
Canadian women dramatists and playwrights
Writers from Montreal
French Quebecers
Place of birth missing (living people)
Actresses from Montreal
21st-century Canadian dramatists and playwrights
21st-century Canadian women writers
Canadian dramatists and playwrights in French
Year of birth missing (living people)